The Lebanon national badminton team represents Lebanon in international badminton team competitions. The national team is controlled by the Lebanon Badminton Federation, the governing body for badminton in Lebanon. The Lebanese team made their international team debut at the 2023 Badminton Asia Mixed Team Championships.

History 
The Lebanese badminton team formed on 28 April 1993 after the establishment of the Lebanon Badminton Federation. The team soon became affiliated with the Lebanese Olympic Committee. Lebanese players made their first international appearances in individual events at the 2013 Mediterranean Games, where badminton was first introduced in the games.  The national junior team competed in the Mediterranean Badminton Championships team event in 2017 but were eliminated in the group stages.

Mixed team 
In 2023, the Lebanese team made their first senior team appearance at the 2023 Badminton Asia Mixed Team Championships. The team were drawn into Group C with Indonesia, Thailand, Bahrain and Syria. The team lost all matches in the group tie and were eliminated in the group stages.

Participation in Badminton Asia Team Championships
Mixed team

Participation in Mediterranean Badminton Championships 
Mixed team U19

Current squad
A new generation of badminton players have been selected to represent Lebanon at the 2023 Badminton Asia Mixed Team Championships.

Men     
Abi Younes Christophe
Oliver Khoury
Raphael Renno

Women
Lynne El-Jabbour
Mira Hussein Agha
Zeina Kazma

References

Badminton
National badminton teams
Badminton in Lebanon